Huirem Seema (full name: Huirem Ningol Laimayum Ongbi Seema; 8 November 1970 - 17 September 2011) was an Indian actress from Imphal, Manipur. She had appeared in more than 100 Manipuri films. As a producer, she had four Manipuri digital films to her credit. She was best known for her roles in movies like Kanaga Hinghouni, Chang Shi Chang, Lakhipurgi Lakhipyari, Naoshum, Yumleima Lamleima and Thasi Thanou. Two films where she acted, namely Yenning Amadi Likla (feature) and Ngaihak Lambida (non-feature) made entries into the Indian Panorama of the International Film Festival of India.

Many of her films like Tolenkhomba (Lakhpati), Amamba Sayon, Naoba Naobi and Langon were released posthumously.

Career
Seema started her film career at a tender age of five years. Her father was a renowned theatre artiste. She also acted in a few plays of leading theatre group Rupmahal Theatre and teleplays for Doordarshan before she shaped her career in movies. Her appearance in movies started since the times of celluloid era of Manipuri cinema. She acted in 15 celluloid films and around 100 digital films. Her debut movie was 31st December, a video film directed by L. Surjakanta. Her notable celluloid films include Nongju Ahing, Aroiba Bidaai and Kanaga Hinghouni. Her appearance in video format films were marked by movies like Mantri Dolansana and One Way. In digital films where she acted, Seema played supporting roles in general. But her acting prowess and versatility could be seen vividly in digital films where she took leading roles. Yumleima Lamleima, Sanahanbi and Thasi Thanou were such films of her.

Besides acting, she had produced four films under the banner of Seema Productions (SF). The movies were Asha, Kalpana, Thamoinungda and Yumleima Lamleima. She co-directed Yumleima Lamleima with Homen D' Wai. She was an approved artiste of All India Radio, Imphal.

Selected filmography

Accolades
 Best Actress in a Leading Role for the role of Mamta in Kanaga Hinghouni (1996) at 3rd Manipur State Film Awards 1999.
 Best Supporting Role for her role in Aroiba Bidaai (1999) at the 4th Manipur State Film Awards.
 Best Actress in a Leading Role for Nongju Ahing (2002) at 6th Manipur State Film Festival.
 Best Supporting Role - Female for her role in Lakhipurgi Lakhipyari (2006) at the First Festival of Manipuri Cinema 2007.
 Best Supporting Actress for the role of Leibaklei in Naoshum (2007) at the 7th Manipur State Film Festival 2010.
 Best Actress in a Leading Role for the role of Thagoi in Thasi Thanou (2010) at 1st Sahitya Seva Samiti MANIFA 2012. The award was given posthumously.

External links

References 

Indian film actresses
21st-century Indian actresses
Meitei people
People from Imphal
Actresses from Manipur
Actresses in Meitei cinema
1974 births
2011 deaths